Charity Clarity is the first independent rating tool for charities. Its aims are to (1) empower donors with the right information to help them make a difference and (2) support charities to highlight their good work and help them succeed.

Charity Clarity provides support to a wide range of charities, foundations and social enterprises through ratings, assessments and impact measurement, assessing charities across 18 metrics in the categories of Financial Health, Accountability, Transparency and Accessibility. In addition it provides extensive PR and digital marketing support, including sentiment analysis; grant applications; and trustee training and events.

Charity Clarity is a technical partner of Asian Voice Charity Awards. The judges for the Awards were able to use a Charity Clarity rating as an independent and robust way of shortlisting the nominations from a competitive field. The supporter for the awards includes Manoj Nair, The Funding Network, and Color TV.

History
Charity Clarity came about because of surveys by New Philanthropy Capital (NPC): their survey with researchers Ipsos MORI found 20% of people said they have little trust in charities. But it was clear that the more people know charities, the more they tend to trust them – 69% of participants who knew ‘a great deal’ or ‘a fair amount’ about charities had high or medium trust in them. These results were similar to Charity Clarity's own survey of 22–34 year-old, largely Indian respondents, who expressed doubts that charities in the community were well governed and had trustees that were adequately trained.

The idea of Charity Clarity was conceived in 2012 after the team saw the difficulty they and others faced in identifying the right charities which achieve social impact in the most effective manner. Since then Charity Clarity has rated over 400 charities and now provide a charity database to help identify the best charities for donors.

See also
Philanthropy
Charitable organisation

References

External links
NPC publications
BBC Asian Network
Giving Tuesday

Organisations based in London
Charities based in the United Kingdom